Elections were held in Missouri on Tuesday, November 2, 2010. Primary elections were held on August 3, 2010.

Federal

United States Senate 

The candidates on the general election ballot are:
Roy Blunt (Republican), U.S. Congressman
Robin Carnahan (Democratic), Missouri Secretary of State
Jerry Beck (Constitution)
Jonathan Dine (Libertarian)
Frazier Miller (Write In), perennial candidate
Deborah Solomon (Independent)

United States House 

All nine Missouri seats in the United States House of Representatives are up for election in 2010.

State

State Auditor

State Senate

Half of the seats of the Missouri Senate are up for election in 2010.

State House of Representatives

All of the seats in the Missouri House of Representatives are up for election in 2010.

Judicial positions
Multiple judicial positions will be up for election in 2010.
Missouri judicial elections, 2010 at Judgepedia

Ballot measures
Six ballot measures are certified for the 2010 statewide ballot. One of them was approved on the August 3, 2010 ballot, and the remaining five will be on the November 2, 2010 ballot.
Missouri 2010 ballot measures at Ballotpedia

Local
Many elections for county offices will also be held on November 2, 2010.

References

Official candidate lists from the Missouri Secretary of State

External links
Elections & Voting at the Missouri Secretary of State
Official candidate lists
Candidates for Missouri Offices at Project Vote Smart
Missouri at Ballotpedia
Missouri Election Guide at Congress.org
Missouri at OurCampaigns.com
Missouri Polls at Pollster.com

Finance
2010 House and Senate Campaign Finance for Missouri at the Federal Election Commission
Missouri Congressional Races in 2010 campaign finance data from OpenSecrets
Missouri 2010 campaign finance data from Follow the Money
Media
News coverage from The Midwest Democracy Project at The Kansas City Star

 
Missouri